The Piedmont Crescent, also known as the Piedmont Urban Crescent, is a large, polycentric urbanized region in the U.S. state of North Carolina that forms the northern section of the rapidly developing  Piedmont Atlantic megalopolis (or "megaregion"), a conurbation also known as the "I-85 Boombelt", which extends from the Raleigh area  to Atlanta, Georgia in the southeastern United States.

The region includes seven of North Carolina's ten largest cities (excepting southeastern Fayetteville, coastal Wilmington and eastern Greenville) and encompasses many smaller cities, towns, and suburban areas. The three major metropolitan areas are the Research Triangle, Piedmont Triad, and Charlotte Metropolitan Area, which have a total population of 6,547,112 people, roughly the same in geographic area (11,256.36 sq mi) and population as the Atlanta, Georgia region (6,555,956 / 10,494.03 sq mi), and together representing over 63% of the state's total population.

Ten major universities—Duke, NC State, UNC Chapel Hill, UNC Charlotte, NC Central, Wake Forest, UNC-Greensboro, NC A&T State University, Elon University and High Point University —and three international airports (CLT, RDU and GSO), as well as Research Triangle Park, also are located in the region.

History

Residents commonly attribute the development of the Crescent communities to the Indian Trading Path and related settlements established by indigenous peoples long before European contact. The Trading Path was also used by European traders, and later by settlers entering the backcountry regions of the piedmont of North Carolina, South Carolina and Georgia.

Forming the shape of a crescent in North Carolina, the region is located in the central Piedmont area of the state. European-American settlement progressed generally from the east to the west, from what is now metropolitan Raleigh-Durham and the Research Triangle area at its eastern edge, through the Piedmont Triad cities of Greensboro and Winston-Salem at its center, and southwest to metropolitan Charlotte. This region has undergone sustained population and economic growth (acutely in the Charlotte and Raleigh areas) since the late 19th century, a trend that has accelerated since the late 20th century. It is notable as the fourth-largest manufacturing region in the country, as well as an international center of banking and finance, textiles, biotech and high technology.

The Piedmont Crescent name is thought to have been coined when the North Carolina Railroad company first laid tracks through the area in 1855–56. The railway, which was named the "Piedmont Crescent Railroad", brought extensive growth to the communities along its route.  These evolved to comprise today's interlinked urbanized region. Although the freight and passenger rail corridor remains of critical importance, the region's Interstate 85 and Interstate 40 freeway system serves as its primary transportation link today.

Major cities

Primary cities
 Charlotte (880,000+)
 Raleigh (470,000+)
 Greensboro (290,000+)
 Durham (270,000+)
 Winston-Salem (250,000+)
 Cary (170,000+)
 High Point (110,000+)

Piedmont Crescent Core Counties

Other cities

 Belmont
 Burlington
 Carrboro
 Chapel Hill
 Clemmons
 Concord
 Garner
 Gastonia

 Graham
 Hillsborough
 Kannapolis
 Kernersville
 Lexington
 Mebane
 Salisbury
 Thomasville

See also
Conurbation
Megalopolis
Megaregions of the United States
Piedmont (train)

References

Geography of North Carolina